The 2016 Munster Senior Football Championship was the 2016 installment of the annual Munster Senior Football Championship held under the auspices of Munster GAA. It is one of the four provincial competitions of the 2016 All-Ireland Senior Football Championship. Kerry entered the competition as defending Munster champions and retained their title after a 3-17 to 2-10 victory over Tipperary	

Last year's Munster finalists receive a bye into this year's Munster semi-finals. The four remaining teams play two quarter-final matches with the winners completing the semi-final line-up. All matches are knock-out.

Teams
The Munster championship is contested by all six counties in the Irish province of Munster.

Bracket

Fixtures

Quarter-finals

Semi-finals

 Tipperary's last victory over Cork in the Munster Senior Football Championship was in 1944.

Munster Final

See also
 2016 All-Ireland Senior Football Championship
 2016 Connacht Senior Football Championship
 2016 Leinster Senior Football Championship
 2016 Ulster Senior Football Championship

References

2M
Munster Senior Football Championship